The 1958 Lehigh Engineers football team was an American football team that represented Lehigh University during the 1958 NCAA College Division football season. Lehigh finished fourth in the Middle Atlantic Conference, University Division, and tied for second in the Middle Three Conference.

In their 13th year under head coach William Leckonby, the Engineers compiled a 3–3–3 record. Charles Burger was the team captain.

In the first year of football competition for the Middle Atlantic Conference, Lehigh finished fourth in the University Division with a record of 2–1–2 against conference opponents. The Engineers went 0–1–1 against the Middle Three, losing to Rutgers and tying Lafayette.

Following their defeat of a ranked Delaware team in the season's opening game, Lehigh entered the UPI Small College Poll at No. 6 in the first week of October. The tie result at Gettysburg dropped them to No. 13 the following week, and the loss to Harvard pushed them out of the top 20. The Engineers remained unranked through the end of the season.

Lehigh played its home games at Taylor Stadium on the university campus in Bethlehem, Pennsylvania.

Schedule

References

Lehigh
Lehigh
Lehigh Mountain Hawks football seasons
Lehigh Engineers football